Thierno Ibrahima Niang (born March 8, 1990) is a Senegalese basketball player who plays for Jeanne d'Arc of the NM1. He played college basketball with the Milwaukee Panthers men's basketball team, although a nagging back injury reduced his role from impact starter to reserve. Niang also competes at international events with the Senegal national team. He played the sport in high school at Bridgton Academy and went on to represent Triton College in Illinois.

Early life
Niang was born in the town of Medina Gounass in Dakar, Senegal to Cheiilh Niang and Ndgye Penda Tall. He moved to the United States  three years before reaching high school.

College career
After completing his years in Bridgton Academy in Maine, Niang represented the Triton College as the team's basketball star. He averaged 6.0 points, 3.8 rebounds, 3.6 assists, and 1.9 steals per game in his freshman season. Niang finished recording 7.7 points, 3.4 rebounds, 4.7 assists, and 1.3 steals on average per game as a sophomore. The team finished with a 27-5 mark in his final season with the Trojans.

Niang orally committed to join the Milwaukee Panthers basketball team and attend University of Wisconsin–Milwaukee on May 10, 2012. He was not rated by Rivals.com or any other major sports recruiting website. Niang joined with two years of eligibility remaining with Donald Thomas and Jordan Aaron.

He made his collegiate debut on November 8, 2013 against University of Mary, with 11 points, 2 rebounds, and 2 assists as the starting guard. This would be Niang's season-high scoring total and one of six starts as a freshman. He suffered a stress fracture in his lower back as the season continued and ultimately ended up a spectator. Niang said, "It happened a little bit earlier and I was able to play with it. But one day it got really bad, and that's when I couldn't even move. When it first happened it was scary, because it was my first back injury. I really thought maybe I wouldn't ever be able to play basketball again. That was the first thing that was kind of in my mind" after the team's annual Tipoff Luncheon at the UW–Milwaukee Panther Arena. He finished the year averaging 3.6 points, 2.6 rebounds, and 1.1 assists in 14 appearances. His most notable display took place against Davidson, when he grabbed 12 total rebounds.

At the conclusion of his sophomore season, Niang averaged 2.4 points, 1.8 rebounds, and 0.8 assists. He scored a season-high 10 points against Loyola Chicago, his only double-digit scoring performance.

Professional career
On December 15, 2014, Niang was signed by Al Geish Army of the Egyptian Basketball Premier League.

On 24 August 2016, Niang agreed terms with Spanish second league team RETAbet.es GBC.

In 2018, he played with DUC Dakar in Senegal. In 2019 and 2020, he played for AS Douanes before returning to DUC. On August 9, 2021, Niang and DUC Dakar won its fifth national championship after defeating AS Douanes in the final. Niang was named also named the league's Finals MVP.

After the 2022 season, in which Niang won the Senegalese Cup with DUC, he signed with league rivals Jeanne d'Arc.

International career
Niang made his first FIBA event appearance with Senegal at the 2011 FIBA Africa Championship. He averaged 3.8 points, 2.6 rebounds, and 1.8 assists, helping the team finish in 5th place.

Niang's name was named to the roster for the 2014 FIBA Basketball World Cup by head coach Cheikh Sarr shortly before the commencement of the tournament. He made his first-ever appearance playing at the level on August 30, 2014 against Greece with one rebound and 0-of-1 shooting off the bench.

BAL career statistics

|-
| style="text-align:left;"|2022
| style="text-align:left;"|DUC
| 5 || 2 || 15.0 || .188 || .000 || 1.000 || 1.4 || 1.8 || 0.6 || 0.0 || 1.8
|-
|- class="sortbottom"
| style="text-align:center;" colspan="2"|Career
| 5 || 2 || 15.0 || .188 || .000 || 1.000 || 1.4 || 1.8 || 0.6 || 0.0 || 1.8

Awards and accomplishments

Club
DUC
Nationale 1 Champion: (2021)
Gizupkoa
LEB Oro Champion: (2017)
DUC

 Senegalese Cup winner: (2022)
 Dakar Municipal Cup winner: (2022)

Individual
Nationale 1 Finals MVP: (2021)

References

External links
Profile at FEB.es

1990 births
Living people
AS Douanes basketball players
2014 FIBA Basketball World Cup players
Junior college men's basketball players in the United States
Liga ACB players
Milwaukee Panthers men's basketball players
Point guards
Gipuzkoa Basket players
DUC Dakar players
Senegalese men's basketball players
Senegalese expatriate basketball people in Egypt
Senegalese expatriate basketball people in Spain
Senegalese expatriate basketball people in the United States
Shooting guards
Triton College alumni
ASC Jeanne d'Arc basketball players